Kerem Hotiç (born April 25, 1993) is a Turkish professional basketball player who  currently plays  for Olin Edirne of the Turkish Basketball League. He is 6 ft 5 in (1.96 m) tall and he weighs 187 lb (92 kg).

References

External links
TBLStat.net Profile

1993 births
Living people
Basketball players from Istanbul
Turkish men's basketball players
Fenerbahçe men's basketball players
Basketball players at the 2010 Summer Youth Olympics
Shooting guards